Dynamopterus velox is a prehistoric bird, known from a  single large right humerus recovered in France. The humerus shares anatomical features with living cuckoos (though it is much larger). It has also been classified in the suborder Cariamae in the Gruiformes.

References

Oligocene birds
Cenozoic birds of Europe
Paleogene France
Fossils of France
Quercy Phosphorites Formation